Hana Jušić (born 1983) is a Croatian film director and screenwriter.

A native of Šibenik, Jušić moved to Zagreb as a child. She majored in comparative literature and English studies at the Faculty of Humanities and Social Sciences, University of Zagreb.

Known earlier in her career for her short films, Jušić received high acclaim for her 2016 feature film debut, Quit Staring at My Plate.

References

External links
 

1983 births
Living people
People from Šibenik
Croatian film directors
Croatian women film directors
Croatian screenwriters
Faculty of Humanities and Social Sciences, University of Zagreb alumni
Golden Arena for Best Director winners